The Montenegrins of Serbia are a national minority in the country. According to the 2011 census, there are 38,527 citizens of recent Montenegrin descent, Montenegrin Serbs, or ethnic Montenegrins in Serbia. They are the sixth largest ethnic community in the Vojvodina province.

Geography

The largest concentration of Montenegrins in Vojvodina could be found in the municipalities of Vrbas (24.79%), Mali Iđoš (20.83%), and Kula (16.34%). Settlements in Vojvodina with an absolute or relative Montenegrin majority are: Lovćenac in the Mali Iđoš municipality with 56.86% Montenegrins, Kruščić in the Kula municipality with 32.64%, and Montenegrins in Savino Selo in the Vrbas municipality with 38.20% Montenegrins. Formerly, the village of Bačko Dobro Polje in the Vrbas municipality also had a Montenegrin majority (According to the 1971 census, Montenegrins comprised 55.39% of population of this village, while according to the 2002 census, the current population of the village is composed of 57.17% Serbs and 38.18% Montenegrins. Also, Montenegrins in Sivac in the Kula municipality had a Montenegrin majority in the 1970's, now they have a sizable minority population of 30.06% according to the 2002 census.

Demographics

In Vojvodina, the number of Montenegrins, according to 1948-2011 censuses: 1948: 30,589 (1.9%); 1953: 30,516 (1.8%); 1961: 34,782 (1.9%); 1971: 36,416 (1.9%); 1981: 43,304 (2.1%); 1991: 47,289 (2.3%); 2002: 35,513 (1.75%); 2011: 22,141 (1.15%).

Culture
Montenegrins in Serbia speak Serbian/Montenegrin and the vast majority are adherents of the Serbian Orthodox Church. The society of Montenegrins in Serbia, known as "Krstaš", is based in Lovćenac. Montenegrin language was recognised as minority language in official use in Mali Iđoš.

Notable people 

 Mihailo Janketić, actor
 Nenad Stevović, politician, publicist, political scientist and a researcher

See also

Serbia-Montenegro relations
Serbs of Montenegro
Serbia and Montenegro
Serbian-Montenegrin unionism
Ethnic groups of Vojvodina
Montenegrin Party

Sources

External links
www.krstas.org.yu

Ethnic groups in Serbia
Ethnic groups in Vojvodina